Russian Jack Springs Park is a public park located in Anchorage, Alaska, managed by the Municipality of Anchorage. The park is named for Jacob "Russian Jack" Marunenko. DeBarr Road, a major east–west arterial road in Anchorage, bisects the park.

The land for the park was transferred to the municipality of Anchorage by the Bureau of Land Management in 1948 and it was initially used as a minimum security prison farm.

It was the site of four murders by Charles L. Meach in 1982.

References

Protected areas of Anchorage, Alaska
Parks in Alaska
Russian-American culture in Alaska
Springs of Alaska